Abdul Rashid Dostum (Uzbek Latin: , Uzbek Cyrillic: , ; born 25 March 1954) is an Afghan exiled politician, former Marshal in the Afghan National Army, founder and leader of the political party Junbish-e Milli. Dostum was a major army commander in the communist government during the Soviet–Afghan War, and in 2001 was the key indigenous ally to US Special Forces and the CIA during the campaign to topple the Taliban government. He is one of the most powerful and notorious warlords since the beginning of the Afghan wars, known for siding with winners during different wars.

An ethnic Uzbek from a peasant family in Jawzjan province, Dostum joined the People's Democratic Party of Afghanistan (PDPA) as a teenager before enlisting in the Afghan National Army and training as a paratrooper, serving in his native region around Sheberghan. Soon with the start of the Soviet–Afghan War, Dostum commanded a KHAD militia and eventually gained a reputation, often defeating mujahideen commanders in northern Afghanistan and even persuading some to defect to the communist cause. Much of the country's north was in strong government control as a result. He achieved several promotions in the army and was honored as a "Hero of Afghanistan" by President Mohammed Najibullah in 1988. By this time he was commanding up to 45,000 troops in the region under his responsibility.

Following the dissolution of the Soviet Union, Dostum played a central role in the collapse of Najibullah's government by "defecting" to the mujahideen; the division-sized loyal forces he commanded in the north became an independent paramilitary of his newly founded party called Junbish-e Milli. He allied with Ahmad Shah Massoud and together they captured Kabul, before another civil war loomed. Initially supporting the new government of Burhanuddin Rabbani, he switched sides in 1994 by allying with Gulbuddin Hekmatyar, but he backed Rabbani again by 1996. During this time he remained in control of the country's north which functioned as a relatively stable proto-state, but remained a loose partner of Massoud in the Northern Alliance. A year later, Mazar-i-Sharif was overrun by his former aide Abdul Malik Pahlawan, resulting in a battle in which he regained control. In 1998, the city was overrun by the Taliban and Dostum fled the country until returning to Afghanistan in 2001, joining the Northern Alliance forces after the US invasion and leading his loyal faction in the Fall of Mazar-i-Sharif.

After the fall of the Taliban, he joined interim president Hamid Karzai's administration as Deputy Defense Minister and later served as chairman Joint Chiefs of Staff of the Afghan Army, a role often viewed as ceremonial. His militia feuded with forces loyal to general Atta Muhammad Nur. Dostum was a candidate in the 2004 elections, and was an ally of victorious Karzai in the 2009 elections. From 2011, he was part of the leadership council of the National Front of Afghanistan along with Ahmad Zia Massoud and Mohammad Mohaqiq. He served as Vice President of Afghanistan in Ashraf Ghani's administration from 2014 to 2020. In 2020 he promoted to marshal rank in after a political agreement between Ghani and former Chief Executive Abdullah Abdullah.

Dostum is a controversial figure in Afghanistan. He is seen as a capable and fierce military leader and remains wildly popular among the Uzbek community in the country; Many of his supporters call him "Pasha" (پاشا), an honorable Uzbek/Turkic term. However he has also been widely accused of committing atrocities and war crimes, most notoriously the suffocation of up to 1,000 Taliban fighters in the Dasht-i-Leili massacre and he was widely feared among the populace. In 2018, the International Criminal Court (ICC) was reported to be considering launching an inquiry into whether Dostum had engaged in war crimes in Afghanistan.

Early life 

Dostum was born in 1954 in Khwaja Du Koh near Sheberghan in Jowzjan province, Afghanistan. Coming from an impoverished ethnic Uzbek family, he received a very basic traditional education as he was forced to drop out of school at a young age. From there, he took up work in the village's major gas fields.

Career 
Dostum began working in 1970 in a state-owned gas refinery in Sheberghan, participating in union politics, as the new government started to arm the staff of the workers in the oil and gas refineries. The reason for this was to create "groups for the defense of the revolution". Because of the new communist ideas entering Afghanistan in the 1970s, he enlisted in the Afghan National Army in 1978. Dostum received his basic military training in Jalalabad. His squadron was deployed in the rural areas around Sheberghan, under the auspices of the Ministry of National Security.

As a Parcham member of the People's Democratic Party of Afghanistan (PDPA), he was exiled by the purge of the party's Khalqist leaders, living in Peshawar, Pakistan for a while. After the Soviet invasion (Operation Storm-333) and installation of Babrak Karmal as head of state, Dostum returned to Afghanistan where he started commanding a local pro-government militia in his native Jawzjan Province.

Soviet–Afghan War 

By the mid-1980s, he commanded around 20,000 militia men and controlled the northern provinces of Afghanistan. While the unit recruited throughout Jowzjan and had a relatively broad base, many of its early troops and commanders came from Dostum's home village. He left the army after the purge of Parchamites, but returned after the Soviet occupation began.

During the Soviet–Afghan War, Dostum was commanding a militia battalion to fight and rout mujahideen forces; he had been appointed an officer due to prior military experience. This eventually became a regiment and later became incorporated into the defense forces as the 53rd Infantry Division. Dostum and his new division reported directly to President Mohammad Najibullah. Later on he became the commander of the military unit 374 in Jowzjan. He defended the Soviet-backed Afghan government against the mujahideen forces throughout the 1980s. While he was only a regional commander, he had largely raised his forces by himself. The Jowzjani militia Dostum controlled was one of the few in the country which was able to be deployed outside its own region. They were deployed in Kandahar in 1988 when Soviet forces were withdrawing from Afghanistan.

Due to his efforts in the army, Dostum was awarded the title "Hero of the Republic of Afghanistan" by President Najibullah.

Civil war and northern Afghanistan autonomous state 

Dostum's men would become an important force in the fall of Kabul in 1992, with Dostum deciding to defect from Najibullah and allying himself with opposition commanders Ahmad Shah Massoud and Sayed Jafar Naderi, the head of the Isma'ili community, and together they captured the capital city. With the help of fellow defectors Mohammad Nabi Azimi and Abdul Wakil, his forces entered Kabul by air in the afternoon of 14 April. He and Massoud fought in a coalition against Gulbuddin Hekmatyar. Massoud and Dostum's forces joined to defend Kabul against Hekmatyar. Some 4,000–5,000 of his troops, units of his Sheberghan-based 53rd Division and Balkh-based Guards Division, garrisoning Bala Hissar fort, Maranjan Hill and Khwaja Rawash Airport, where they stopped Najibullah from entering to flee.

Dostum then left Kabul for his northern stronghold Mazar-i-Sharif, where he ruled, in effect, an independent region (or 'proto-state'), often referred as the Northern Autonomous Zone. He printed his own Afghan currency, ran a small airline named Balkh Air, and formed relations with countries like Uzbekistan effectively creating his own proto-state with an army of up to 40,000 men, and with tanks supplied by Uzbekistan and Russia. While the rest of the country was in chaos, his region remained prosperous and functional, and it won him the support from people of all ethnic groups. Many people fled to his territory to escape the violence and fundamentalism imposed by the Taliban later on. In 1994, Dostum allied himself with Gulbuddin Hekmatyar against the government of Burhanuddin Rabbani and Ahmad Shah Massoud, but in 1995 sided with the government again.

Taliban era 

Following the rise of the Taliban and their capture of Kabul, Dostum aligned himself with the Northern Alliance (United Front) against the Taliban. The Northern Alliance was assembled in late 1996 by Dostum, Massoud and Karim Khalili against the Taliban. At this point he is said to have had a force of some 50,000 men supported by both aircraft and tanks.

Much like other Northern Alliance leaders, Dostum also faced infighting within his group and was later forced to surrender his power to General Abdul Malik Pahlawan. Malik entered into secret negotiations with the Taliban, who promised to respect his authority over much of northern Afghanistan, in exchange for the apprehension of Ismail Khan, one of their enemies. Accordingly, on 25 May 1997, Malik arrested Khan, handed him over and let the Taliban enter Mazar-e-Sharif, giving them control over most of northern Afghanistan. Because of this, Dostum was forced to flee to Turkey. However, Malik soon realized that the Taliban were not sincere with their promises as he saw his men being disarmed. He then rejoined the Northern Alliance, and turned against his erstwhile allies, driving them from Mazar-e-Sharif. In October 1997, Dostum returned from exile and retook charge. After Dostum briefly regained control of Mazar-e-Sharif, the Taliban returned in 1998 and he again fled to Turkey.

Operation Enduring Freedom 

Dostum returned to Afghanistan in May 2001 to open up a new front before the U.S.-led campaign against the Taliban joined him, along with Commander Massoud, Ismail Khan and Mohammad Mohaqiq. On 17 October 2001, the CIA's eight-man Team Alpha, including Johnny Micheal Spann landed in the Dar-e-Suf to link up with Dostum. Three days later, the 12 members of Operational Detachment Alpha (ODA) 595 landed to join forces with Dostum and Team Alpha. Dostum, the Tajik commander Atta Muhammad Nur and their American allies defeated Taliban forces and recaptured Mazar-i-Sharif on 10 November 2001.

On 24 November 2001, 15,000 Taliban soldiers were due to surrender after the Siege of Kunduz to American and Northern Alliance forces. Instead, 400 Al-Qaeda prisoners arrived just outside Mazar-i-Sharif. After they surrendered to Dostum, they were transferred to the 19th century garrison fortress, Qala-i-Jangi. The next day, while being questioned by CIA officers Spann and David Tyson, they used concealed weapons to revolt, triggering what became the Battle of Qala-i-Jangi against the guards. The uprising was finally brought under control after six days.

Dasht-i-Leili massacre 

Dostum has been accused by Western journalists of responsibility for the suffocating or otherwise killing of Taliban prisoners in December 2001, with the number of victims estimated as 2,000. In 2009, Dostum denied the accusations and US President Obama ordered an investigation into the massacre.

Karzai administration 

In the aftermath of Taliban's removal from northern Afghanistan, forces loyal to Dostum frequently clashed with Tajik forces loyal to Atta Muhammad Nur. Atta's men kidnapped and killed a number of Dostum's men, and constantly agitated to gain control of Mazar-e-Sharif. Through the political mediations of the Karzai administration, the International Security Assistance Force (ISAF) and the United Nations, the Dostum-Atta feud has gradually declined. They are now aligned in a new political party

Dostum served as deputy defense minister the early period of the Karzai administration. On 20 May 2003, Dostum narrowly escaped an assassination attempt. He was often residing outside Afghanistan, mainly in Turkey. In February 2008, he was suspended after the apparent kidnapping and torture of a political rival.

Time in Turkey 
Some media reports in 2008 stated earlier that Dostum was "seeking political asylum" in Turkey while others said he was exiled. One Turkish media outlet said Dostum was visiting after flying there with then Turkey's Foreign Minister Ali Babacan during a meeting of the Organization for Security and Cooperation in Europe (OSCE).

On 16 August 2009, Dostum was asked to return from exile to Afghanistan to support President Hamid Karzai in his bid for re-election. He later flew by helicopter to his northern stronghold of Sheberghan, where he was greeted by thousands of his supporters in the local stadium. He subsequently made overtures to the United States, promising he could "destroy the Taliban and al Qaeda" if supported by the U.S., saying that "the U.S. needs strong friends like Dostum."

Ghani administration 

On 7 October 2013, the day after filing his nomination for the 2014 general elections as running mate of Ashraf Ghani, Dostum issued a press statement that some news media were willing to welcome as "apologies": "Many mistakes were made during the civil war (…) It is time we apologize to the Afghan people who were sacrificed due to our negative policies (…) I apologize to the people who suffered from the violence and civil war (…)".

Dostum was directly chosen as First Vice President of Afghanistan in the April–June 2014 Afghan presidential election, next to Ashraf Ghani as president and Sarwar Danish as second vice president.

In July 2016, Human Rights Watch accused Abdul Rashid Dostum's National Islamic Movement of Afghanistan of killing, abusing and looting civilians in the northern Faryab Province during June. Militia forces loyal to Dostum stated that the civilians they targeted – at least 13 killed and 32 wounded – were supporters of the Taliban.

In November 2016, at a buzkashi match, he punched his political rival Ahmad Ischi, and then his bodyguards beat Ischi. In 2017, he was accused of having Ischi kidnapped in that incident and raped with a gun on camera during a five-day detention, claims that Dostum denies but that nevertheless forced him into exile in Turkey.

On 26 July 2018, he narrowly escaped a suicide bombing by ISIL-KP as he returned to Afghanistan at Kabul airport. Just after Dostum's convoy departed the airport, an attacker armed with a suicide vest bombed a crowd of several hundred people celebrating his return at the entrance to the airport. The attack killed 14 and injured 50, including civilians and armed security.

On 30 March 2019, Dostum again escaped an expected assassination attempt while traveling from Mazar-e-Sharif to Jawzjan Province, though two of his bodyguards were killed. The Taliban claimed responsibility for the attack, the second in eight months.

On 11 August 2021 during the Taliban's nationwide offensive, Dostum, along with Atta Muhammad Nur, led the government's defence of the city of Mazar-i-Sharif. Three days later, they fled across Hairatan to Uzbekistan. Atta Nur claimed that they were forced to flee due to a "conspiracy". Both men later pled allegiance to the National Resistance Front of Afghanistan, the remaining remnants of the collapsed Islamic Republic of Afghanistan. Dostum, Atta, Yunus Qanuni, Abdul Rasul Sayyaf and some other political figures formed the Supreme Council of National Resistance of the Islamic Republic of Afghanistan in opposition to the new Taliban regime in October 2021.

Political and social views 
Dostum is considered to be liberal and somewhat leftist. Being ethnic Uzbek, he has worked on the battlefield with leaders from all other major ethnic groups, Hazaras, Tajiks and Pashtuns. When Dostum was ruling his northern Afghanistan proto-state before the Taliban took over in 1998, women were able to go about unveiled, girls were allowed to go to school and study at the University of Balkh, cinemas showed Indian films, music played on television, and Russian vodka and German beer were openly available: activities which were all banned by the Taliban.

He viewed the ISAF forces attempt to crush the Taliban as ineffective and has gone on record saying in 2007 that he could mop up the Taliban "in six months" if allowed to raise a 10,000 strong army of Afghan veterans. As of 2007, senior Afghan government officials did not trust Dostum as they were concerned that he might be secretly rearming his forces.

Personal life
He generally favors to wear a camouflage Soviet style military uniform, and has had a trademark bushy moustache.

Dostum was married to a woman named Khadija. According to Brian Glyn Williams, Khadija had an accidental death in the 1990s which broke Dostum as he "really loved his wife". Dostum eventually remarried after Khadija's death.

He named one of his sons Mustafa Kamal, after the founder of the modern Turkish republic, Mustafa Kemal Ataturk. Dostum has spent a considerable amount of time in Turkey, and some of his family reside there.

Dostum is known to drink alcohol, a rarity in Afghanistan, and apparently a fan of Russian vodka. He reportedly suffered from diabetes. In 2014 when he became vice president, Dostum reportedly gave up drinking for healthy meals and morning jogs.

In popular culture 
 Navid Negahban portrays Dostum in the 2018 film 12 Strong.
 Dostum appears as a playing card in the board game A Distant Plain.

References

Bibliography

External links

 General Abdul Rashid Dostum's official website
 Article on Abdul Rashid Dostum on Islamic Republic Of Afghanistan (.com)
 BBC online profile
 Biography about Dostum
 CNN Presents: House of War
 Afghanistan Mass Grave: The Dasht-e Leili War Crimes Investigation
 As possible Afghan war-crimes evidence removed, U.S. silent
 Obama Calls for Probe into 2001 Massacre of Suspected Taliban POWs by US-Backed Afghan Warlord – video by Democracy Now!
 Eyewitness account from National Geographic war reporter Robert Young Pelton

1954 births
Living people
Afghan military personnel
Vice presidents of Afghanistan
Afghan warlords
Afghanistan conflict (1978–present)
People of the Soviet–Afghan War
Afghan communists
National Islamic Movement of Afghanistan politicians
People from Jowzjan Province
Afghan expatriates in Turkey
Afghan exiles
Afghan expatriates in Pakistan
Democratic Republic of Afghanistan
Islamic State of Afghanistan
20th-century Afghan politicians
Afghan Uzbek politicians
Afghan military officers
Marshals